Reinaldo Dalcin is a Brazilian model, mechanical engineer and the winner of the Mister Brazil 2013.

He was announced the winner of Mister Brazil during the annual event held in Rio de Janeiro on April 5 of that year. At 1.80m, he represented the Delta do Jacuí Islands and was represented Brazil in Mister World 2014 on June 15, 2014, an event to be held in Torbay, England.

References

Brazilian male models
Male beauty pageant winners
Living people
Year of birth missing (living people)